Amr Diab (born on 11 October 1961) is an Egyptian singer, composer and actor. He has established himself as a globally acclaimed recording artist and author. He is a Guinness World Record holder, the best selling Middle Eastern artist, a seven-times winner of World Music Awards and five-times winner of Platinum Records.

Early life
Diab was born as Amr Abdel Basset Abdel Azeez Diab (Arabic: عمرو عبد الباسط عبد العزيز دياب) on 11 October 1961 in Port Said to a middle-class Muslim family from the Egyptian countryside of Menia Elamh, in Sharqia Governorate, Egypt. Diab graduated with a bachelor's degree in music from the Cairo Academy of Arts in 1986.

Music career
Diab released his first album entitled  in 1983.

By 1992, he became the first Egyptian and Middle Eastern artist to start making high-tech music videos.

In 1996, Diab released his first album with Alam El Phan entitled , and he won the World Music Award for the first time, which proved an international success and gained Diab recognition beyond the Arabic-speaking world. Diab recorded four more albums with Alam El Phan, including  (1999). Diab also collaborated with Khaled (on the song "") and with Angela Dimitriou (on the song "Bahebak Aktar").

According to research by Michael Frishkopf, he has created a style in the song "", termed as "Mediterranean music", a blend of Western and Egyptian rhythms.

 was released for sale on the internet on 27 June 2009; however, the album was leaked online and was downloaded illegally amid complaints of slow download speed on the official site. Diab's fans initiated a massive boycott of the sites with the illegal copies.

On 18 October 2009, Diab won four 2009 African Music Awards in the categories of best artist, album, vocalist and song for ""; Diab had been nominated by the Big Apple Music Awards.

In February 2011, Diab released his hit single  ("Egypt spoke"), followed by the release of his album  in September, produced by Rotana. In 2012, Diab hosted the first Google Hangout in the Middle East during his performance in Dubai. In October 2014, Diab released his album , which topped his last album  and again became the best-selling album in Egypt on iTunes. In July 2015, Diab released a music video for his song "" from his album . In March 2016, he released , his first album since he left Rotana Music. The album was produced by the record label Nay For Media. His new album  was released in July 2017 with Nay Records.

His 2014 album  peaked at No. 1 on the Billboard World Albums Charts, making him the first Egyptian and Middle Eastern performer to accomplish such a feat.

In October 2018, he released a new album called . In 2019, he released a mini-album, and in February 2020 he released his 35th album, which included 16 songs.

In February 2022, Anghami announced an exclusive partnership that will see the Diab's entire Nay Label audio and video catalogue and future releases available only on Anghami.

Musical style
Diab is known as the "father of Mediterranean music". David Cooper and Kevin Dawe refer to his music as "the new breed of Mediterranean music". According to author Michael Frishkopf, Diab has produced a new concept of Mediterranean music, especially with his international hit, "". Moreover, Diab is known as a composer, having composed more than 97 of his own songs.

Music videos 

Diab is one of the first singers to popularize music videos in the whole MENA region and is the first Egyptian singer to appear in music videos.

Film career 

Diab's fame in the music industry has led him to experiment with other forms of media, such as film. Diab played himself in his first film, which was released in 1989. It also starred Madiha Kamel. His second film was Hussein El-Imam's production Ice Cream in Gleam, in which Diab starred in 1992, was chosen as one of the best five Egyptian musical films by the University of California, Los Angeles (ULCA) School of Theater, Film and Television. The film was featured in the UCLA Film and Television Archive's new program "Music on the Nile: Fifty Years of Egyptian Musical Films" at James Bridges Theater at UCLA on 6, 8 and 10 April 1999. David Chute of the LA Weekly termed it "observant" and "a big leap". His third movie was released in 1993, and was named  (Laughter and Fun). The film premiered in the Egyptian Film Festival in 1993. Diab played alongside international Egyptian movie star Omar Sharif (Lawrence of Arabia, Doctor Zhivago) and Yousra. Overall, Diab did not experience the same level of success in film that he had with his music career. Since 1993, Diab has focused on his singing career.

Amr Diab in movies 
Diab's songs have been used in several films, including:
 "" in Divine Intervention (2002)
 "" in The Dancer Upstairs (2002)
 "" and "" in O Clone (2001)
 "" in Double Whammy (2001)
 "" and "" in Coco (2009)
 "" in The Dictator (2012)

Egyptian Revolution 

During the 2011 uprising, some protesters criticized Diab for staying silent, and for fleeing Egypt for London. A few days after former President Hosni Mubarak stepped down, Diab composed and sang a memorial song, "" (Egypt Said), and released it in conjunction with a music video showing pictures of the martyrs who died in the uprising. He initiated a charity campaign "" ("Truly Egyptian"). His online radio station Diab FM often presents talks and discussions about what the Diab FM team can offer to the community as well as applying it practically by being present in different sites across Egypt with a new humanitarian project each week.

Personal life 
Diab has an elder daughter from his first marriage to Egyptian actress Shereen Reda. In 1994, he was married to Saudi businesswoman Zeina Ashour. They have three children. In 2018, he went on to marry Egyptian actress, Dina El Sherbiny, after his relationship with Ashour ended. It is unknown whether they were separated or divorced. However, Diab and El Sherbiny separated in late 2020.

Discography

Main studio albums

Famous songs

Awards 
He has been awarded the World Music Award for Best Selling Middle Eastern Artist four times: 1996 for album , 2001 for album Akter Wahed, 2007 for album El Lillady and 2013 for  album. He has also won (Best Egyptian Artist, Best Male Arab Artist and World's Best Arab Male Artist Voted Online) at the World Music Awards 2014. Amr Diab is the only Middle Eastern artist to have received 7 World Music Awards. Five of his albums reached the top 10 of Billboard's World Albums chart, with  reaching No. 1 in 2014, the first for an Arabic performer. Alongside that accomplishment, two of his albums (2014's  and 2016's ) both peaked at 29 and 14 respectively on Billboard's Heatseekers charts.

On 28 September 2016, Diab announced that he achieved a Guinness World Records title for "Most World Music Awards for Best Selling Middle Eastern Artist".

List of awards received by Amr Diab
 Seven World Music Awards (1997/2001/2007/2014/2020)
 Six African Music Awards (2009/2010)
 Two All Africa Music Awards (2016/2017) 
 Guinness World Record (2016)

Program "Al-helm" 
A program produced by Amr Afifi, consisting of 12 parts aired on Rotana Music, Rotana Cinema and Egyptian Channel 1 station. The program detailed the biography of Diab and was scheduled to be launched simultaneously with the release of Amr Diab's new album, but the album's release was postponed to a later date.

References

External links 

 
 Amr Diab World (archive)
 

1961 births
Living people
Actors from Port Said 
Egyptian male film actors 
Egyptian male television actors 
Egyptian male actors 
Egyptian composers 
20th-century Egyptian male singers
21st-century Egyptian male singers
Egyptian Muslims
Egyptian singer-songwriters
Singers from Port Said
Singers who perform in Egyptian Arabic
World Music Awards winners